Francisca Ashietey-Odunton is a Ghanaian journalist, broadcaster and diplomat. She was formerly the Acting Director-General of the Ghana Broadcasting Corporation and currently Ghana's high commissioner to Kenya.

Early life
Francisca Ashietey-Odunton attended Aburi Girls' Senior High School for her Ordinary and Advanced Level Certificates. She went to the Kwame Nkrumah University of Science and Technology where she obtained a Bachelors of Arts degree in Social Sciences with a major in English.

Ashietey-Odunton is a barrister at law with 16 years of experience, having been called to the Ghana Bar after obtaining her LLB from the Ghana School of Law in 1997. She holds a master's degree from the London School of Economics. She is also a graduate of the United Nations University in Tokyo, Japan.

Career
Francisca Ashietey-Odunton has over 20 years' experience as a broadcaster with the Ghana Broadcasting Corporation. She joined the Ghana Broadcasting Corporation in 1990 as a senior production assistant attached to the Production Division where she worked on various programmes including Kyekyekule, Children's Own, Adult Education and Country Music. She was also a TV presenter. She rose through the ranks as producer and director, after which she was transferred to the TV newsroom in 1994. She served in various capacities there as news reader, editor and  presidential correspondent for eight years. She later became Chief Editor and was transferred to the legal division as Senior Legal Officer. Ashietey-Odunton has covered international conferences, including the African Union Summit, Ecowas Summit and World Food Summit.

She was first appointed Deputy Director-General General of the Ghana Broadcasting Corporation in November 2013. She was subsequently made the Acting Director-General of the Ghana Broadcasting Corporation in May, 2016.

Ambassadorial appointment
On Wednesday 2 August 2017, the president of the republic of Ghana;
Nana Akuffo-Addo named Francisca Ashietey-Odunton as Ghana's high commissioner to Kenya. She was among four other distinguished Ghanaians who were named to head various diplomatic Ghanaian missions in the world.
She was later appointed as Ghana’s high commissioner to Turkey in the year 2020 and is currently serving her term.

Personal life
Ashietey-Odunton is married to Olu Christopher Odunton and is a mother of two daughters-- Akushika and Duki

References

Ghanaian television presenters
Ghanaian women television presenters
Ghanaian journalists
Living people
Kwame Nkrumah University of Science and Technology alumni
Alumni of the London School of Economics
Ghana School of Law alumni
Alumni of Aburi Girls' Senior High School
Year of birth missing (living people)
Ghanaian women journalists